Studentski grad ('Students' town/city') is the student campus area for most universities in Sofia, the capital of Bulgaria, and also one of the 24 districts of Sofia. It was created in the 1980s and now has over 40,000 residents. The real number of people living temporarily there can hardly be estimated.

It is one of the most diversified areas in Sofia, with old dwellings from the communist era which are inhabited by the students of different Sofia universities, and new nightclubs, trade, business and residential centres. The construction boom has already taken its toll as overdevelopment appears ubiquitous. Parking lots and green areas remain inadequate. The year 2011 marked the set-up of the largest skatepark on the Balkans situated within the park area in front of the University of National and World Economy. Two multifunctional halls, Hristo Botev and the Winter Palace of Sports, host a number of events on regular basis. Because of the usually cheap rent (less than €20 per month), it is very attractive for living. Recent renovations have brought about improvements in many dormitories, including those hosting foreign students. They are mostly from the Bulgarian diaspora in Macedonia, Moldova, Ukraine, Serbia, and since 2004, non-Bulgarians from Turkey.

The area is famous for its busy nightlife. A variety of taverns and disco clubs make the campus one of the central night entertainment locations of Sofia. Studentski grad hosts a district police department that strives to tackle the fast-growing alcohol-driven offenses, thefts, vandalism, football fans clashing, etc. The brutal murder of the student Stojan Baltov by drunken youths outside a disco club sparked debates on social environment and security issues, including the development of an integral video surveillance system. Places for eating out vary from high-end restaurants to cheap pizzerias. Particularly popular is the so-called Mandzha street where a number of banitsa pastry,  burger, Döner kebab and pancake shops are lined up.

Unlike most campus areas in Western Europe and Northern America, Studentski grad is a common living place for most of the students of Sofia's numerous universities rather than being in the vicinity of one particular university. This helps students from different higher education institutions meet and interact, but on the other hand causes major transportation issues as the bulk of Sofia's university faculties are situated relatively far from the city center and public transport is often unable to cope with Studentski grad's needs. The traffic is frequently congested especially during rush hours in the mornings and late afternoons. Regular buses run on average every ten minutes. Fixed-route minibus taxis called marshrutka alleviate the situation. Sofia municipality plans to connect Studentski grad with its metro system.

The neighbourhood is affectionately known as "Stuttgart". The abbreviation from Stud. (Studentski, "student") and grad ("city") resembles the name of the German city of Stuttgart.

Universities located in Studentski grad 
 Technical University of Sofia
 University of National and World Economy
 University of Mining and Geology
 University of Forestry, Sofia
 University of Chemical Technology and Metallurgy
 National Sports Academy, Vassil Levski

References

External links

 Studentskigrad.com

Districts of Sofia